The Journey is the second studio album by Tina Guo. It was released on December 12, 2011. The album featured the Budapest Symphony Orchestra and the composers from Nuno Malo, Frédéric Chopin and Astor Piazzolla.

Track listing
 Lament 4:20
 Introduction and Polonaise Brillante in C Major, for Cello and Piano, Op. 3 9:06
 Le Grand Tango 11:16
 Winter Star 5:10
 Winter Starlight 5:09
 The Awakening 5:06
 Lacrimosa 1:59
 Sunlight 1:05
 The Journey Home 2:54
 Forbidden City 3:59
 Queen Bee 2:17

Release history

References

External links
 Tina Guo – The Journey
 The Journey - Tina Guo
The Journey

2011 classical albums
Tina Guo albums
New-age albums